The Lower Rhine region or Niederrhein is a region around the Lower Rhine section of the river Rhine in North Rhine-Westphalia, Germany between approximately Oberhausen and Krefeld in the East and the Dutch border around Kleve in the West. As the region can be defined either geographically, linguistically, culturally, or by political, economic and traffic relations throughout the centuries, as well as by more recent political subdivisions, its precise borders are disputable and occasionally may be seen as extending beyond the Dutch border. Yet, while the Dutch half of the Lower Rhine geographic area is called Nederrijn in Dutch, it is a separate territory from the adjoining German Niederrhein region, despite both names being a translation of the other. 

A cultural bond of the German Lower Rhine region is its Low Franconian language, specifically the Cleverlander dialect (Dutch: Kleverlands, German: Kleverländisch), which is closely related to the Dutch dialects of South Guelderish just across the border. In the region's southeastern portion Bergish is spoken, which is the easternmost dialect of Limburgish. Other typicalities of the area include the predominantly Catholic background as well as the Rhenish Carnival tradition. 

The area basically covers the districts of Cleves, Wesel, Viersen and Neuss as well as the independent cities of Duisburg, Mönchengladbach and Krefeld. While disputable, Oberhausen and Düsseldorf may also be seen as part of the Lower Rhine region. 

The Lower Rhine region's landscape is mostly flat green grassland with wide views of the horizon. Sights include the historic town centers of Cleves and Xanten, as well as Xanten's Roman archeological museum, the castle "Schloss Moyland" in Bedburg-Hau or the Catholic pilgrimage town of Kevelaer.

See also  
 Regierungsbezirk Düsseldorf Government region 
 Weeze Airport

References

External links  

  
 www.niederrhein-tourismus.de  
 LVR-Archäologischer Park Xanten  (archived 22 October 2008)

Regions of North Rhine-Westphalia
Rhineland